Łysiec  is a village in the administrative district of Gmina Starcza, within Częstochowa County, in southern Poland.

The village has a population of 384.

References

Villages in Częstochowa County